Ketterman was an unincorporated community in Vernon County, in the U.S. state of Missouri.

History
A post office called Ketterman was established in 1885, and remained in operation until 1904. The community had the name of M. Ketterman, an early settler.

References

Unincorporated communities in Vernon County, Missouri
Unincorporated communities in Missouri